Vinod Kumar Sharma is an Indian actor, writer and director who works in Hindi films, television and stage. He is the recipient of a Sangeet Natak Akademi Award for direction in theatre. He is the founder and director of Khilona Theatre Company, since September 1987. It's India's first professional company of adults performing for children.

Personal life
Sharma was born and brought up in Delhi. He is an alumnus of National School of Drama. He has been married to Kiran Sharma, since 1989. The couple has a son named Kashish Sharma. Kiran is a costume designer, director, playwright and actress. She has directed many plays with Khilona Theatre group. She also serves as the co-director of Khilona Theatre group.

Filmography

References

External links

 

Living people
Indian actors
National School of Drama alumni
1949 births
Recipients of the Sangeet Natak Akademi Award